Rubellimicrobium thermophilum is a strictly aerobic and moderately thermophilic bacterium from the genus of Rubellimicrobium.

References 

Rhodobacteraceae
Bacteria described in 2006